Samuel Joseph Piraro (born December 22, 1951) is an American baseball coach who was head coach at San Jose State from 1987 to 2002 and again from 2004 to 2012. Piraro led San Jose State to its first College World Series appearance in 2000.

Head coaching record

Junior College
Source:

College

High school
Source:

References

1951 births
Living people
American people of Italian descent
High school baseball coaches in the United States
Mission Saints baseball coaches
San Jose State Spartans baseball coaches
Baseball players from San Jose, California
San Jose State Spartans baseball players